Men, Women & Children is the debut and only studio album released by the Long Island-based dance-rock band Men, Women & Children.

Track listing

 "Dance in My Blood" – 4:18
 "Lightning Strikes Twice in New York" – 3:13
 "Photosynthesis (We're Losing O²)" – 3:14
 "Who Found Mister Fabulous?" – 3:48
 "Messy" – 3:22
 "At Night We Like to Fight" – 3:48
 "Monkey Monkee Men" – 2:24
 "Time for the Future (Bang Bang)" – 3:19
 "The Name of the Train is the Hurricane" – 3:37
 "¡Celebracion!" – 3:34
 "Sell Your Money" – 3:30
 "Vowels" – 3:24

All music by Men, Women & Children
Lyrics by TJ Penzone
Additional lyrics by Todd Weinstock

Personnel
Nick Conceller - keyboards, programming, synthesizer, production
David "Scully" Sullivan-Kaplan - drums, production
Rick Penzone - bass guitar, guitar, keyboard, synthesizer, additional percussion, string composition, production
TJ Penzone - vocals, production
Todd Weinstock - guitars, production
Nathaniel Walcott - string/horn arrangements
Micky Petralia - additional programming
Lenny Castro - percussion
Chantal Kreviazuk - additional vocals on Monkey Monkee Men
Danny Kalb - engineering
Ryan Williams - engineering
AJ Mogis - engineering
Rudyard Lee Cullers - mix engineer
Mike Sapone - pre-production, additional recording
Sean McCabe - art direction, photography, design
Dave Winchell - photography, insert design
Josh Abraham - additional production on Dance In My Blood, Monkey Monkee Men
Mike Mogis - additional production on Lighting Strikes Twice In New York, At Night We Like To Fight, Time For The Future (Bang Bang), The Name Of The Train Is The Hurricane, ¡Celebracion!, Sell Your Money
Raine Maida - additional production on Photosynthesis (We're Losing O2), Who Found Mister Fabulous?, Messy, Vowels
Jason Lader - additional production on Photosynthesis (We're Losing O2), Who Found Mister Fabulous?, Messy, Vowels
Alan Moulder - mixing on Dance In My Blood
Gareth Jones - mixing on tracks 2-12

References

Men, Women & Children (band) albums
2006 debut albums
Reprise Records albums
Albums produced by Josh Abraham
Albums produced by Mike Sapone